Walter Adrián Jiménez  (born 29 August 1977 in Buenos Aires) is an Argentine former professional footballer.

His nickname is Lorito which means Parrot.

Career
Jiménez joined Santos Laguna in 2006, becoming a stalwart of the side. In May 2010, he was loaned to an Argentine club for six months after Santos had filled all of its available foreign player slots for the upcoming tournament.

Jiménez signed for Ascenso MX side Irapuato in July 2012.

Honours

Club
Santos Laguna
 Primera División de México - Clausura 2008

References

External links

1977 births
Living people
Footballers from Buenos Aires
Argentine footballers
Argentine Primera División players
Club Atlético Banfield footballers
Instituto footballers
Club Atlético Platense footballers
Club de Gimnasia y Esgrima La Plata footballers
C.D. Veracruz footballers
Santos Laguna footballers
Chiapas F.C. footballers
Club Puebla players
Irapuato F.C. footballers
Liga MX players
Expatriate footballers in Mexico
Argentine expatriate footballers
Association football midfielders